Mos was a Burmese comedian and actor who became famous in kyuntot Thabin Tin Moe Win Drama with comedian Moe Di. He won the Best Supporting Actor award at the 2011 Myanmar Academy Award for his performance in the film Eternal Rays of Light.

Awards and nominations

Death
Before the 2011 Myanmar Academy Award which was held in 2013, Mos had to be treated at the SSC Hospital every Wednesday due to a liver disease. He died at the SSC Hospital on February 13, 2013, at 4:20 am.

References 

21st-century Burmese male actors
1954 births
2013 deaths
Burmese male film actors